This is a list of wealthy Serbs.

List

References

Further reading

Lists of people by wealth
Net worth
Net worth
Net worth
Net worth